Cheez Whiz is a brand of processed cheese sauce or spread produced by Kraft Foods. It was developed by a team led by food scientist Edwin Traisman (1915–2007). It was first sold in 1952, and with some changes in formulation continues to be in production today.

Orangish-yellow in color, it usually comes in a glass jar and is used as a topping for various foods, including corn chips and hot dogs. It is also frequently used as the cheese in a Philadelphia-style cheesesteak. It is marketed in Canada, Mexico, the Philippines, the United States, and Venezuela. In the United States it has a reputation as being junk food.

Ingredients 

A 1953 ad in Kraft Foods’ home city, Chicago, included a label illustration listing the product’s original ingredients: “American Cheese, Water, Nonfat Dry Milk Solids, Condensed Whey, Sodium Phosphate, Cream, Worcestershire Sauce, Lactic Acid, Mustard, Salt, U.S. Certified Color--Moisture 52%, Milkfat 28%.”

As of 2016, Kraft describes Cheez Whiz as a "cheese dip" with the word cheese spelled correctly. According to a Kraft spokesman, the product does include cheese, but the company has chosen to list its parts—such as cheese culture and milk—instead of cheese as a component itself.

Sizes 
In some markets, the product has been sold in a narrow jar that tapered narrower towards the base, and sold as a spread. When Cheez Whiz is advertised as a dip or a sauce, the jars are larger and more of a squat cylindrical shape.

Varieties 

Varieties include:
 Cheez Whiz
 Cheez Whiz Light
 Cheez Whiz Tex Mex
 Salsa Con Queso
 Cheez Whiz Italia
 Cheez Whiz Bacon
 Cheez Whiz Pimento

Cheez Whiz can also be found in "Handi Snacks" products such as Ritz Cheez Whiz 'n' Crackers in Canada.

Cheez Whiz was reformulated in the early 21st century. The new formula is used for Cheez Whiz Light (15.5 oz) as well as the Original Big Cheese (15 oz). The products' jars were also widened to allow dipping.

Formula change 

Over the years since the product's creation, Kraft has altered its recipe due to changes in dairy sourcing and the regulatory environment, resulting in a reduction of cheese content. Kraft also made a change in the way that it lists its ingredients; away from listing components (like cheese) to listing its parts (such as milk and cheese culture). Such changes are common throughout the food industry, and are often done without announcement.

Dean Southworth, who was part of the original team that developed Cheez Whiz in the 1950s, described a jar he sampled in 2001 as tasting "like axle grease".

See also 
 Cheese sauce
 Easy Cheese a form of cheese product in a spray can
 Kraft Dinner
 Plant cheese
 Velveeta
 Welsh rarebit

References

External links 

 Official website (archived, 11 Feb 2021)

American cheeses
Kraft Foods brands
Processed cheese
Products introduced in 1953
Spreads (food)